Sea to Sea: I See the Cross is the second album in the annual Sea to Sea praise and worship music series.  The album includes thirty songs performed by Canadian Christian artists on two CDs.  The album won a Gospel Music Association Canada Covenant Award in 2006 for Special Events/Compilation
Album of the Year. The Sea to Sea series is the brainchild of Covenant Award winning Executive Producer Martin Smith.

Track listing

Disc 1 

Lift Me Higher - Shezza
Do You Hear the Sound? - Elias Dummer
Thank You for Your Love - Meeting House
King of My Heart - Tara Dettman
Open Sky - Dan Macaulay
Glimmer - Elevate
Merciful - Curtis Mulder
Lord We Come to You - Margaret Graham
Alive in This Moment - Starfield
Shelter - Sean Dayton
Surround Me - Drentch
Rest in His Promise - David Ruis
Walk into Heaven - North Park Community Church
You - Stephanie Mainville
If Anything Is Excellent - Jaylene Johnson

Disc 2 

I See the Cross - Brian Doerksen
Evidence - Chanda Cooper
Life of Worship - Jon Bauer
There Is a Redeemer - Heather Clark / Martin Jones
Home - Matt Brouwer
Holy Is Your Name - The Kry
Lord of the Starfields - Ali Matthews
Holy Holy Holy Is the Lord - Tim Van Brummelon / Willow Park Church
You Are God and You Are Wonderful - Lianna Klassen
Going Back to the Source - Graham Ord
Not My Own - Lowana Wallace
J'espere en toi - Tabitha Lemaire
You Heard My Cry - Jane Erickson
You Are - Joe Di Francesco
We Receive Your Blessing - Grace & Natasha Moes

References 

Contemporary Christian music albums by Canadian artists
2005 compilation albums